U.S. Seals II: The Ultimate Force (also known simply as U.S. Seals II) is a 2001 American direct-to-video action film directed by Isaac Florentine, written by Boaz Davidson and Michael D. Weiss, and starring Michael Worth. The film is a sequel to U.S. Seals (2000) and is followed by U.S. Seals 3: Frogmen (2002).

Plot
A group of retired US SEALs needs to prevent a nuclear attack against United States, planned by an ex-SEAL. Thereunto, they can use only blade weapons since the villain's hideout is covered by leaked natural gas.

Cast

 Michael Worth as Lieutenant Casey Sheppard
 Karen Kim as Kamiko / Nikki
 Damian Chapa as Chief Frank Ratliff
 Marshall R. Teague as Major Nathan Donner
 Kate Connor as Dr. Jane Burrows
 Sophia Crawford as Sophie
 Hakim Alston as Omar
 Andy Cheng as Artie
 Mitchell Gould as Harper
 Dan Southworth as Finley
 George Cheung as Sensei Matsumura

Reception

Critical response
U.S. Seals 2 was reviewed by several websites and blog specialized in trash, direct-to-video and B movies. Most of them praised the film, considering it a typical so bad it's good film and a cult classic in the action genre.

Direct to Video Connoisseur praised some aspects of the movie: "This is for B action fans only, because it is bad action to the max, and if you have trouble with how unabashedly and unironically bad action this is, you probably won't enjoy it. Otherwise buckle up and have a good time". The blog Explosive Action gave U.S. Seals 2 a very good review, concluding: "U.S. Seals 2 is a solid mercenary bad-actioner from the turn of the century, with a great director and writer managing a solid cast. No messy Avid-farts and epilepsy-enducing techniques utilised here either. Good stuff indeed, and easily the best penny DVD I've ever bought". Website Good Efficient Butchery praised Florentine direction, arguing that U.S. Seals 2 is so bad that it's good: "U.S. SEALS II isn't Florentine's best film, but it's probably his most well-known (his two UNDISPUTED sequels are awesome). It became a word-of-mouth hit among video store employees and bad movie fans with its constant whoosh sound effects whenever someone moves". Marty McKee from Johnny LaRue's Crane Shot considered the film one of the best action films he ever seen: "U.S. SEALS II: THE ULTIMATE FORCE is nothing less than one of the best direct-to-video action movies ever made. In fact, its energy and spectacular fight sequences are thrilling enough to rank U.S. SEALS II among the best action films of the 21st century so far, period". Monster Hunter praised the Florentine's work on the film and the non-stop action, concluding that U.S. Seals 2 is far better than its predecessor: "The movie doesn't skimp or let you down with its hand to hand action, sending an endless supply of Ratliff's henchman against the Seals! Guys are flipping, spinning around, flying through the air, falling off rubble, getting sliced by swords and whacked by chains!" The Video Vacuum called it "almost epic in its badness" and stated: "U.S. Seals 2 is one of those movies that have generous helpings of So-Bad-It's-Good moments sprinkled in with So-Bad-It's-Awesome scenes that makes you shake your head in disbelief".

Sequel
A sequel titled U.S. Seals 3: Frogmen, was released in 2002.

References

External links
 
 
 
 

American action films
American direct-to-video films
Direct-to-video action films
Films about United States Navy SEALs
2001 films
2000s English-language films
Films directed by Isaac Florentine
2000s American films